The Braque Saint-Germain (translated into English as the St. Germain Pointing Dog) is a medium-large breed of dog, a versatile hunter used for hunting as a gun dog and pointer as well as for hunting other small game. Braque is a term meaning pointing dogs. The breed was created around 1830 by crossing English and French pointing type dogs.

Appearance 
A typical pointer, with a medium build and an attractive fawn and white coat, drop ears, and a long tail which is held level while the dog is working. The Braque Saint-Germain stands  at the withers, females somewhat smaller.

History 

Bred first in the royal kennels at Compiègne around 1830 from a mix of English and Continental pointers, the breed grew in fame in Saint Germain en Laye,  where it received its name. Although a popular hunting dog, the breed achieved its greatest fame as a showdog. Starting from the first dog show in France in 1863, it was the most shown pointing breed. The French breed club was established in 1913. The breed is recognised internationally by the Fédération Cynologique Internationale in Group 7, Pointing Dogs, Section 1.1 Continental Type Pointing Dog. It is also recognised in North America by the United Kennel Club as of 2006. The breed is also recognized by a number of minor registries, hunting clubs and internet-based dog registry businesses and promoted as a rare breed for those seeking unique pets.

Health and temperament 
No unusual health problems or claims of extraordinary health have been documented for this breed.
Its temperament is described in the breed standard as having a soft mouth (for retrieving without damaging the game), handling rough treatment well and being a "hunter above all" that appreciates living with its human's family.

See also
 Dogs portal
 List of dog breeds

References

External links 

FCI breeds
Rare dog breeds
Gundogs
Pointers
Dog breeds originating in France